The Dalek Factor is an original novella written by Simon Clark and based on the long-running British science fiction television series Doctor Who. It features a Doctor whose incarnation is unspecified. It was released both as a standard edition hardback and a deluxe edition featuring a frontispiece by Graham Humphreys. Both editions have a foreword by Christopher Fowler.

Other Meanings 
The term "Dalek Factor" is also used in the serial The Evil of the Daleks, as the opposite to the Human Factor.

External links
 
 The Cloister Library - The Dalek Factor

2004 British novels
2004 science fiction novels
Dalek novels
Doctor Who novellas
Novels by Simon Clark
Telos Publishing books